José Pastenes (10 July 1915 – 16 July 1993) was a Chilean footballer. He played in 14 matches for the Chile national football team from 1941 to 1945. He was also part of Chile's squad for the 1941 South American Championship.

References

External links
 

1915 births
1993 deaths
Chilean footballers
Chile international footballers
Place of birth missing
Association football midfielders
Colo-Colo footballers